Arquitectonica is an international architecture, landscape architecture, interior design, and urban planning design firm headquartered in Miami, Florida’s Coconut Grove neighborhood. The firm also has offices in ten other cities throughout the world. Arquitectonica began in 1977 as an experimental studio founded by Peruvian architect Bernardo Fort-Brescia, Laurinda Hope Spear, Andrés Duany, Elizabeth Plater-Zyberk, and Hervin Romney.

Today, the firm continues to be led by Bernardo Fort-Brescia and Laurinda Hope Spear, and has designed such famous buildings as the Banco de Credito Headquarters, Lima (1988), Atlantis Condominium, the Pink House, and the American Airlines Arena in Miami and the Westin Hotel and entertainment complex in New York, amongst many others. Until 2010, Arquitectonica's global headquarters were in Downtown Miami, until their new offices at 2900 Oak Avenue in the Coconut Grove neighborhood of Miami were opened in 2010. Arquitectonica also has regional offices in New York City, Los Angeles, Madrid, Paris, Hong Kong, Shanghai, Manila, Dubai, São Paulo, and Lima.

The firm is known for sophisticated surface patterning and facade articulation. Arquitectonica's structures are bold in color and graphic in form and the firm has become famous for its signature style, a dramatic, expressive 'high tech' modernism. In June 2011, two new major projects were announced for Arquitectonica, both in Downtown Miami: the new $700 million Brickell City Centre project in Miami's Brickell neighborhood, and the $3-billion Genting Resorts World Miami project in Miami's Arts & Entertainment District neighborhood.

Works and projects

United States

Hong Kong
 Cyberport Campus, Pok Fu Lam
 Festival Walk in Kowloon Tong, Kowloon
 Novotel Citygate Hong Kong in Tung Chung, Lantau
 Landmark East in Kwun Tong, Kowloon East
 Forfar, Kowloon
 Homantin Hillside, Ho Man Tin

Macau
 City of Dreams Casino Resort, Cotai

China 
 Riviera TwinStar Square, Shanghai
 The Longemont Shanghai Hotel, Shanghai
 King Glory Plaza, Shenzhen
 Taikoo Hui, Guangzhou
 ABC & CCB Bank Headquarters, Shanghai
 Mandarin Oriental Hotel, Shanghai
 Longemont Hotel and Office Tower, Shanghai
 West Mangrove, Shenzhen
 Haiya Megamall, SHenzhen

Philippines 

 OneE-Com Center, Manila
 SM Bay City District (Master Plan)
 SM Mall of Asia, Bay City, Pasay, Metro Manila
 One Rockwell, Makati, Metro Manila
 The Beaufort, Bonifacio Global City, Taguig, Metro Manila
 Pacific Plaza Towers, Fort Bonifacio, Taguig, Metro Manila
 Fairmont Raffles Makati, Metro Manila
 Mall of Asia Arena, Pasay, Metro Manila
 SM City North EDSA Mall, Quezon City, Metro Manila
 SM Megamall expansion and renovation, Ortigas Center, Mandaluyong, Metro Manila
 SMX Convention Center Manila, Pasay, Metro Manila
 SM Aura Premier, Bonifacio Global City, Taguig, Metro Manila
 SM Seaside City Cebu, Cebu City, Cebu
 BDO Corporate Center, Ortigas Center, Mandaluyong, Metro Manila
 The Podium West Tower, Ortigas Center, Mandaluyong, Metro Manila

Peru 
 Marriott Hotel in Lima, 
 Banco de Crédito headquarters, Lima
 United States Embassy, Lima
 Westin Libertador Lima Lima
 HSBC headquarters in Lima
 Luxury Collection Paracas Resort & Spa, Paracas
 Luxury Collection Tambo del Inka Hotel, Urubamba

Singapore 
 Alba Condominium
 Leonie Hill Serviced Apartments
 Orchard Scotts Hotel & Residences
 Visioncrest Condominium

Indonesia 
 BonaVista Apartements, Jakarta
 Menara Karya, Jakarta
 Menara Satrio (Standard Chartered Tower), Jakarta
 Tempo Scan Tower, Jakarta
 Satrio Square, Jakarta

Czech Republic 
 Bubny Intermodal Center, Prague
 Marriott Hotel & Offices, Prague

France 
 Auditorium de Dijon, (Opéra de Dijon) Dijon, France
 Mazars Headquarters, (Exaltis Tower) Courbevoie, Paris, France
 Microsoft Headquarters, (EOS Generali) Issy les Moulineaux, Paris, France
 Accor Headquarters, (Tour Sequana) Issy les Moulineaux, Paris, France
 EQWATER Office Building, Issy les Moulineaux, Paris, France

Lebanon 
 Beb Beirut, Beirut
 Plus Towers, Beirut

United Arab Emirates 
 The Gate Shams, Abu Dhabi 
 Lulu Island, Abu Dhabi
 Al Manhal, Abu Dhabi
 Al Mashtal, Abu Dhabi

Dominican Republic 
 Columbus Bay Master Plan, Monte Cristi Province

Italy 
 Porta Nuova Condominium
 Solaria & Aria Towers, Milan

Japan 
 Nexus World Condominium

Luxembourg 
Banque de Luxembourg Headquarters

Spain 
 Lorca Mall, Lorca

South Korea
 International Financial Center, Seoul

Venezuela 
 Caracas Palace Hotel (Ex-Four Seasons).

Others 
 Sharm El Sheikh Resort, Sharm El Sheikh, Egypt
 Icon Vallarta, Puerto Vallarta

Future projects 
Miami Beach Convention Center
 JW Marriott Nashville

References

External links 

 
 Bronx Museum

Architecture firms based in Florida
Companies based in Miami
Companies based in Miami-Dade County, Florida
Brescia family
Arquitectonica